Joseph Raphael (1869–1950) was an American Impressionist painter who spent most of his career as an expatriate but maintained close ties with the artistic community of San Francisco, California.

Biography

Born in the town of Jackson, California on June 2, 1869,  Raphael studied with Arthur F. Mathews at the California School of Design. In 1902 he entered the École nationale supérieure des Beaux-Arts in Paris, but then moved to the Académie Julian and studied under Jean-Paul Laurens. He spent parts of the next several years in the Netherlands, producing paintings in a dark style derived from the Dutch Masters. In 1906 his large oil La Fete du Bourgmestre received an honorable mention at the Paris Salon; it was subsequently purchased by a group of friends in San Francisco and given to the San Francisco Art Association. In 1910 he had a solo exhibition at the San Francisco Institute of Art; beginning in 1913 he had annual exhibitions at Helgesen Galleries, San Francisco. He would ship artworks to his San Francisco friend and patron Albert M. Bender, who bought some and encouraged friends to buy others. Raphael also participated in the annual group shows of the San Francisco Art Association.

Before long he adopted a style borrowed from French Impressionism, eventually using broader, freer, more Post-Impressionist brushstrokes. By 1912 he was married and living in Uccle, Belgium, a suburb of Brussels. He produced many paintings of the countryside near his home. As Raphael's international reputation grew, his family grew as well, to include four daughters and a son. His family frequently appeared in his figurative works. By the early 1930s Raphael and his family were living in a suburb of Leiden, Holland, and he painted often in nearby Bruges. In 1939, with World War II approaching, he returned to San Francisco, where he lived and maintained a studio on Sutter Street until his death on December 11, 1950.

Known primarily as a painter, Raphael was also a skilled printmaker, creating numerous etchings and color woodcuts of European and San Francisco Bay Area scenes.

Museum collections 
Fine Arts Museums of San Francisco
Oakland Museum of California
San Francisco Museum of Modern Art
Monterey Museum of Art
Krannert Art Museum, University of Illinois

Awards 
Honorable Mention, Paris Salon, 1906
Silver Medal, Panama-Pacific International Exposition, San Francisco, 1915
Gold Medal, Panama-California Exposition, San Diego, 1915

References

Sources 
Plein Air Painters of the North, by Ruth Lily Westphal, 1996
Artists in California, 1786-1940, by Edan Milton Hughes, 2002
Montgomery Gallery, San Francisco

Additional references
Joseph Raphael (1869-1950): An Artistic Journey (Spanierman Gallery, 2003)  
California Art Research (1937), vol. 5, pp. 32–42

19th-century American painters
19th-century American male artists
American male painters
20th-century American painters
20th-century American male artists
American Impressionist painters
Painters from California
1869 births
1950 deaths
Modern painters
People from Uccle
People from Jackson, California